Bagriltsi is a village in Krumovgrad Municipality, Kardzhali Province, southern Bulgaria. It is situated in the region Khaskovo in Bulgaria.

References

Villages in Kardzhali Province